Karl Heinrich Tomingas (or Toomingas; 22 May 1892 – 13 February 1969) was an Estonian politician. He was a member of Estonian Constituent Assembly. On 7 September 1920, he resigned his position and he was replaced by Verner Nerep.

He was born in Sindi Municipality, Pärnu County.

References

1892 births
1969 deaths
Members of the Estonian Constituent Assembly
People from Tori Parish